The 1953–54 Bradley Braves men's basketball team represented Bradley University in college basketball during the 1953–54 season. The team finished the season with a 19–13 record and were national runners-up to La Salle University in the 1954 NCAA tournament. It was the second time in five seasons that Bradley was the national runner-up; in 1949–50, they lost to CCNY in both the NCAA and NIT championships.

Schedule and results

|-
!colspan=9 style="background:#BA122B; color:#FFFFFF;"|  Regular season

|-
!colspan=9 style="background:#BA122B; color:#FFFFFF;"| 1954 NCAA Tournament

Source

References

Bradley Braves men's basketball seasons
NCAA Division I men's basketball tournament Final Four seasons
Bradley
Bradley
Bradley Braves Men's Basketball Team
Bradley Braves Men's Basketball Team